Deep Ellum station is a DART Light Rail station located in Dallas, Texas. It is located near the Deep Ellum neighborhood and serves the DART .  The station opened on September 14, 2009 as one of four original stops on the line.

Traveling Man sculptures 

Deep Ellum station is also home to a three-part stainless steel sculpture series called The Traveling Man created by Brandon Oldenburg of Deep Ellum's own Reel FX Creative Studios and Brad Oldham of Dallas-based Brad Oldham Inc. The three sculptures are located at different intersections in Deep Ellum. The first is at Good Latimer between Swiss Ave. and Miranda, directly across from the station.  The second is at the corner of Gaston and Good Latimer.  The third is at the corner of Good Latimer and Elm Street.

References

External links 
Dallas Area Rapid Transit - Deep Ellum Station

Dallas Area Rapid Transit light rail stations in Dallas
Railway stations in the United States opened in 2009
2009 establishments in Texas
Railway stations in Dallas County, Texas